Israel Octavio Hernández Pat (born 27 June 1976) is a Mexican football manager.

He has spent most of his career on the bench for youth teams of Santos Laguna, América and Cruz Azul. He got the runner-up twice with Santos Laguna.

On September 20, 2016, he was the manager of the Club América first team after the dismissal of Ignacio Ambriz. The only game under his direction, the team tied a goal against Necaxa.

In January 2018 he was the managerial assistant at Celaya F.C., but he only stayed for one match.

On July 1, 2020 Hernández was named as the Manager of Celaya F.C., a team that plays in the Liga de Expansión MX. Being his first formal position as Manager in a first team. Hernández would remain in Celaya until the summer of 2022. Later he was appointed as manager of Deportivo Malacateco, a team that plays in Liga Nacional de Fútbol de Guatemala.

References 

1976 births
Living people
Mexican football managers
Club Celaya managers